Nasirabad (also Romanized as Naşīrābād; also known as Naşrābād-e Torpākhlū) is a village in Qanibeyglu Rural District, Zanjanrud District, Zanjan County, Zanjan Province, Iran. At the 2006 census, its population was 698, in 164 families.

References 

Populated places in Zanjan County